Eli & Fur are a DJ and electronic music producer duo comprising Eliza Noble and Jennifer Skillman, hailing from London, England. Eli & Fur have been working together since they were in their teens. The group has a background in songwriting and while they started out in DJ music, they are moving into live acts using Ableton software. Instead of mixing other tracks, Eli & Fur write and play their own tracks, which creates a sound that is "distinctly electronic, mixing house and dance beats."

The duo’s debut track, "You’re So High" (2013) reached the top 3 on Hype Machine and has since received over 45 million views on YouTube. Their debut EP, Illusions was released by NYX Records on July 22, 2013.

Eli & Fur toured the United States in 2015.

In December 2018, they were featured in a travel advertisement for Kayak, creating music with sounds sourced during a trip to Japan.

Discography

Studio albums 
 Found in the Wild (2021)

Remix albums 
 Found in the Wild (Remixed) (2021)

Extended plays 
 Illusions (2013)
 California Love (2015)
 Night Blooming Jasmine (2018)
 Into The Night (2019)

Singles

As lead artist 
 "Sea of Stars" (2012, NYX)
 "Nightmares" (2013, NYX)
 Davidian & Eli & Fur - "Let it Go" (2013, NYX)
 "Feel the Fire" (2014, Anjunadeep)
 "Hold Me Down" (2016, NYX) (Beatport exclusive)
 "On My Own" featuring Forrest (2016, NYX)
 TACHES x Eli & Fur - "Lookalike" (2016, Different)
 "Chlo" / "Wendy Legs" (2017, Anjunadeep)
 «Otherside» (2020, Spinnin' Deep)
 «Walk The Line» / «Big Tiger» (2020, Anjunadeep)
 «Carbon» (2021, Anjunadeep)
 «Temptation» (2022, Anjunadeep)
 MEDUZA x Eli & Fur - «Pegasus» (2023, Anjunadeep)
 «Where I Find My Mind» (2023, Anjunadeep)

As featured artist 
 Clancy featuring Eli & Fur - "I Wanna Know" (2014, Anjunadeep)
 Erick Morillo featuring Eli & Fur - "Thunder & Lightning" (2016, Subliminal)

Guest appearances 
 MANIK featuring Eli & Fur - "Far Away" (2014, Anjunadeep) (from Far Away / Mulberry)
 Way Out West featuring Eli & Fur - "Running Away" (2017, Anjunadeep) (from Tuesday Maybe)
 CamelPhat and Eli & Fur - "Waiting" (2020, Sony) (from Dark Matter)

Remixes 
 Apres - "Chicago" (Eli & Fur Remix) (2015, SubSoul)
 Chase & Status And Blossoms - "This Moment" (Eli & Fur Remix) (2017, Virgin)

References

External links 
 Official site
 Interview (Morocco World News 2015)

English house music duos
Female musical duos
Musical groups from London
DJs from London
English women DJs
DJ duos